Christ Church, Long Lane is a Grade II listed  parish church in the Church of England in Long Lane, Derbyshire.

History

The church dates from 1859. It was built by the contractor William Evans of Ellastone to the designs of the architect Robert Evans of Hine and Evans in Nottingham for a cost of £900. It was consecrated on 8 October 1859 by the Bishop of Lichfield. The east window was by William Wales of Newcastle.

The tower and vestry were added in 1874.

Organ

The organ is by I Abbott. A specification of the organ can be found on the National Pipe Organ Register.

Parish status

The church is in a joint parish with 
St John the Baptist's Church, Boylestone
St Michael and All Angels' Church, Church Broughton
St Chad's Church, Longford
All Saints' Church, Dalbury
St Andrew's Church, Radbourne
St Michael's Church, Sutton-on-the-Hill
All Saints’ Church, Trusley

References

Church of England church buildings in Derbyshire
Grade II listed churches in Derbyshire